Baptists is a Canadian metallic hardcore band from Vancouver, British Columbia, Canada, formed in 2010 by Andrew Drury, Danny Marshall, Shawn Hawryluk and Nick Yacyshyn.

Discography

Studio albums
Bushcraft (2013)
Bloodmines (2014)
Beacon of Faith (2018)

EPs
Baptists (2010)

Members
Andrew Drury - vocals
Danny Marshall - guitar
Shawn Hawryluk - bass
Nick Yacyshyn - drums (also in Sumac)

Musical style
Baptists have been categorized as metallic hardcore, crust punk and hardcore punk.

References

Canadian metalcore musical groups
Canadian crust and d-beat groups
2010 establishments in Canada
Musical groups established in 2010
Musical quartets